The Smashing Pumpkins are an alternative rock band formed in Chicago, Illinois in 1988. The band was formed by guitarist/vocalist Billy Corgan and guitarist James Iha after the demise of Corgan's first band, the Marked. Since its inception, the Smashing Pumpkins has gone through multiple line-up changes, with Corgan the only consistent member.

After the breakup of his gothic rock band the Marked, singer and guitarist Billy Corgan left St. Petersburg, Florida, to return to his native city of Chicago, where he took a job in a record store. While working there, he met guitarist James Iha. The pair soon began writing songs together with the aid of a drum machine. Corgan met bassist D'arcy Wretzky in mid 1988 after a show by the Dan Reed Network where they argued the merits of the band. After finding out Wretzky played bass, Corgan stated his band's need for a bassist and gave Wretzky his telephone number. Wretzky soon joined the band, and she and Iha later had a short-lived romance.

The first performance of the Smashing Pumpkins was on July 9, 1988, at the Polish bar Chicago 21. This performance included only Corgan and Iha with a drum machine. On August 10, 1988, the band played for the first time as a trio at the Avalon Nightclub. After this show, Cabaret Metro owner Joe Shanahan agreed to book the band on the condition that they replace the drum machine with a live drummer. Jazz drummer Jimmy Chamberlin was recruited for the band after a recommendation from a friend of Corgan's. On October 5, 1988, the complete band took the stage for the first time at the Cabaret Metro.

Soon after the release of their third album, Mellon Collie and the Infinite Sadness in 1995, the group recruited keyboardist Jonathan Melvoin to perform on the ensuing tour. However, on July 11, 1996, Melvion and Chamberlin overdosed on heroin in a New York City hotel room. Melvoin died, and Chamberlin was arrested for drug possession. A few days later, the band announced that Chamberlin had been fired as a result of the incident. The Pumpkins chose to finish the tour, and hired drummer Matt Walker and keyboardist Dennis Flemion as temporary replacements. Corgan later said the decision to continue touring was the worst the band had ever made, damaging both their music and their reputation.

In early 1999, Jimmy Chamberlin rejoined the band; however, the lineup was short-lived, as bassist D'arcy Wretzky announced her departure that September. She was subsequently replaced by former Hole bassist, Melissa Auf der Maur, who performed on the “Sacred and Profane" tour and appeared in music videos. On May 23, 2000, in a live radio interview on KROQ-FM (Los Angeles), Billy Corgan announced the band's decision to break up at the end of that year following additional touring and recording. The Smashing Pumpkins played at the Cabaret Metro on December 2, 2000, before a six-year disbandment.

On July 21, 2005, Corgan stated in full-page advertisements in the Chicago Tribune and Chicago Sun-Times to announce that he had planned to reunite the band. On April 20, 2006, the band's official website confirmed the reunion. Corgan and Chamberlin were verified as participants in the reunion, but there was question as to whether other former members of the band would participate. In April 2007, Iha and Auf der Maur separately confirmed that they were not taking part in the reunion. Wretzky did not make an announcement, but Chamberlin would later state that Iha and Wretzky "didn't want to be a part of" the reunion. The Smashing Pumpkins performed live for the first time since 2000 on May 22, 2007, in Paris, France, with new members Jeff Schroeder on guitar and Ginger Reyes on bass guitar, as well as keyboardist Lisa Harriton.

This line-up toured to promote the 2007 album Zeitgeist and performed again throughout 2008 to celebrate the band's 20th anniversary—this time, the instrumentation was augmented by No Doubt trumpeter Stephen Bradley and trombonist Gabrial McNair, Kristopher Pooley on accordion and keyboards, and Gingger Shankar playing the rare 10-string violin. In March 2009, Corgan announced on the band's website that longtime drummer Jimmy Chamberlin, had left the group; Chamberlin stated that the split was amicable, commenting that he was "glad [Corgan] has chosen to continue under the name. It is his right." Corgan later stated that he fired Chamberlin and began searching for his replacement. In August 2009, Corgan confirmed on the band's website that drummer Mike Byrne had replaced Chamberlin after a series of open auditions. Keyboardist Lisa Harriton quietly left the group in 2009. In March 2010, bassist Ginger Reyes (now Ginger Pooley) officially left the band in order to focus on her family and was briefly replaced by Mark Tulin of the Electric Prunes. In May 2010, Nicole Fiorentino was announced as the official replacement for Pooley. However, she was later dismissed from the band in 2014, alongside Byrne. In 2015, Chamberlin rejoined the band once again on a touring basis. In February 2018, Iha and Chamberlin officially rejoined for the Shiny And Oh So Bright Tour.

Members

Current 
, the official lineup of the Smashing Pumpkins includes one vocalist/guitarist/bassist/keyboardist, one guitarist/keyboardist, one bassist/guitarist, and one drummer.

Current touring musicians
The following members accompanied the band in a live setting, while providing few, if any, studio contributions.

Former 
The former members of the Smashing Pumpkins consist of two bassists, one bassist/keyboardist and one drummer.

Former touring musicians 
The following members accompanied the band in a live setting, while providing few, if any, studio contributions.

Studio and guest musicians 
The following musicians appeared on a Smashing Pumpkins album but were not part of the band.

Gish (1991)
Mary Gaines – cello on "Daydream"
Chris Wagner – violin and viola on "Daydream"

Siamese Dream (1993)
 Mike Mills – piano on "Soma"
 Eric Remschneider – string arrangements and cello on "Disarm" and "Luna"
 David Ragsdale – string arrangements and violin on "Disarm" and "Luna"

Pisces Iscariot (1994)
Kerry Brown – drums on "Blew Away"

Mellon Collie and the Infinite Sadness (1995)
 Chicago Symphony Orchestra – orchestra in "Tonight, Tonight"
 Greg Leisz – pedal and lap steel guitar on "Take Me Down"'

The Aeroplane Flies High
 Keith Brown – piano
 Bill Corgan Sr. – guitar solo on "The Last Song"
 Dennis Flemion – instruments on "Medellia of the Gray Skies
 Jimmy Flemion – instruments on "Medellia of the Gray Skies
 Nina Gordon – vocals on "...Said Sadly"
 Chris Martin – piano
 Eric Remschneider – cello on "The Bells"
 Adam Schlesinger – piano on "The Bells"

Adore (1998)
 Matt Walker – drums on "To Sheila", "Ava Adore", "Daphne Descends", "Tear", "The Tale of Dusty and Pistol Pete", "Annie-Dog", and "Behold! The Night Mare"
 Matt Cameron – drums on "For Martha"
 Joey Waronker – drums on "Perfect", additional drums on "Once Upon a Time" and "Pug"
 Dennis Flemion – additional vocals in "To Sheila" and "Behold! The Night Mare"
 Jimmy Flemion – additional vocals in "To Sheila" and "Behold! The Night Mare"
 Bon Harris – additional programming on tracks 2–5, 7–9 and 13; additional vocals in "For Martha"
 Brad Wood – additional vocals in "Behold! The Night Mare", organ in "Blank Page"

Machina/The Machines of God (2000)
Mike Garson – piano on "With Every Light"
Bjorn Thorsrud – programming
Machina II/The Friends & Enemies of Modern Music (2000)
 Mike Garson – piano on "Le Deux Machina" 

Teargarden by Kaleidyscope (2010)
Kerry Brown– congas
Ysanne Spevack – violin, viola
Linda Strawberry – backing vocals
Mark Tulin – bass

Oceania
 Kevin Dippold – backing vocals

Monuments to an Elegy (2014)
Tommy Lee – drums, percussion
 Sstaria (Sheri Shaw) – backing vocals on "Anaise!"

Shiny and Oh So Bright, Vol. 1 / LP: No Past. No Future. No Sun.
 The Section Quartet – strings on "Knights of Malta" and "Alienation"
 Daphne Chen – violin
 Richard Dodd – cello 
 Eric Forman – violin
 Leah Katz – viola
 Charissa Nielsen, Briana Lee, Missi Hale – additional background vocals on "Knights of Malta"

Cyr (2020)
Katie Cole – backing vocals
Sierra Swan – backing vocals

Atum: A Rock Opera in Three Acts (2023)
 Katie Cole – backing vocals
 Mike Garson – piano
 Sierra Swan – backing vocals

Timeline

Line-ups

References 
General

 
 Azerrad, Michael. "Smashing Pumpkins' Sudden Impact". Rolling Stone. October 1, 1993.
 DeRogatis, Jim. Milk It!: Collected Musings on the Alternative Music Explosion of the 90's. Cambridge: Da Capo, 2003. 
 Kot, Greg. "Pumpkin Seeds". Guitar World. January 2002.
 Thompson, Dave. "Smashing Pumpkins", in Alternative Rock. San Francisco: Miller Freeman, 2000. 

Specific

 
Lists of members by band